First-seeded Nancye Bolton defeated Nell Hopman 6–3, 6–2 in the final to win the women's singles tennis title at the 1947 Australian Championships.

Seeds
The seeded players are listed below. Nancye Bolton is the champion; others show the round in which they were eliminated.

 Nancye Bolton (champion)
 Thelma Long (semifinals)
 Joyce Fitch (quarterfinals)
 Sadie Newcombe (second round)
 Pat Jones (semifinals)
 Nell Hopman (finalist)
 Mary Beavis (quarterfinals)
 Constance Wilson (quarterfinals)

Draw

Key
 Q = Qualifier
 WC = Wild card
 LL = Lucky loser
 r = Retired

Finals

Earlier rounds

Section 1

Section 2

External links
 

1947 in women's tennis
1947
1947 in Australian tennis
1947 in Australian women's sport